Charles Henry Roberts (22 August 1865 – 25 June 1959) was a British radical Liberal politician.

Early life
Roberts was the son of Reverend Albert James Roberts, Vicar of Tidebrook, Sussex and Ellen Wace of Wadhurst, Sussex and was educated at Marlborough College and Balliol College, Oxford.

He was a fellow of Exeter College, Oxford, where he taught from 1889 to 1895.

Career
He was the unsuccessful Liberal candidate for Wednesbury in the 1895 general election and for Lincoln in 1900. He was elected to Parliament for Lincoln in the 1906 general election and reelected in both elections in 1910.

He served under H. H. Asquith as Under-Secretary of State for India 1914 to 1915.  He was then made both Comptroller of the Household and Chairman of the National Health Insurance Joint Committee from 1915 to 1916.

He lost his seat in 1918 when the Coalition Government gave endorsement to his Unionist opponent, but returned briefly to the House of Commons in 1922 when he was elected for Derby. However, he lost this seat in the 1923 general election and retired from national politics.

He afterwards committed himself to work creation schemes in Cumberland, reopening collieries and starting brickworks, limeworks and quarries. He also became involved in farming. From 1938–58 he was chairman of Cumberland County Council and the Cumberland branch of the National Farmers' Union. He also chaired the Aborigines' Protection Society. He was Chairman of the Cumberland War Agricultural Committee, 1939–47. He served as a Justice of the Peace in Cumberland from 1900 to 1950 and was Deputy Chairman of Cumberland Quarter Sessions until 1950.

Personal life
On 7 April 1891, he was married Lady Cecilia Maude Howard, daughter of George Howard, 9th Earl of Carlisle. They had one son and two daughters, including.

 Rosa Winifred Roberts (1893–1981), an artist who married the English painter Ben Nicholson.
 Wilfrid Hubert Wace Roberts (1900–1991), a Liberal MP who married three times.

Lady Cecilia died in 1947. Roberts died on 25 June 1959.

Election results

References

External links 
 

1865 births
1959 deaths
People from Wadhurst
Liberal Party (UK) MPs for English constituencies
UK MPs 1906–1910
UK MPs 1910
UK MPs 1910–1918
UK MPs 1922–1923
Politics of Lincoln, England
Politics of Derby
People educated at Marlborough College
Alumni of Balliol College, Oxford
English justices of the peace